Errol Joseph Linden (October 21, 1937 – March 10, 1983) was a National Football League (NFL) offensive tackle. Linden was selected in the tenth round by the Detroit Lions out of the University of Houston in the 1961 NFL Draft and played ten seasons

He died of cancer in a hospital at the age of 45.

External links
 The New York Times death notice
NFL.com player page
Stats

1937 births
1983 deaths
American football offensive tackles
Houston Cougars football players
Cleveland Browns players
Minnesota Vikings players
Atlanta Falcons players
New Orleans Saints players
Players of American football from New Orleans
Deaths from cancer in Louisiana